Lola Randl (born 1980 in Munich) is a German film director and screenwriter.

Life and work
In 2001 Lola Randl started to study film direction at the Academy of Media Arts Cologne. She graduated in 2006 with the short film Wohlfühlwochenende. After her studies in Cologne, she attended the Screenplay Workshop (Drehbuchwerkstatt München) at the Munich University of Film and Television and left in 2007 as a graduate.
In Between Days / Die Besucherin (2008) was Lola Randl's feature film debut and premiered at the 58th Berlin International Film Festival.

Filmography (selection)
2004: Nachmittagsprogramm (short film) —  film direction, screenplay
2006: Feel-Good Weekend / Wohlfühlwochenende (short film) — film direction, screenplay
2008: Die Leiden des Herrn Karpf – Der Besuch (short film) — film direction, camera, screenplay
2008: In Between Days / Die Besucherin — film direction, screenplay
2009: The Suffering of Mr. Karpf – The Birthday / Die Leiden des Herrn Karpf – Der Geburtstag (short film) — film direction, camera, screenplay
2012: The Dragonfly and the Rhinoceros / Die Libelle und das Nashorn — film direction, screenplay
2013: The Invention Of Love / Die Erfindung der Liebe - film direction, screenplay
2014: Landschwärmer (TV series) - film direction, camera, screenplay

Awards and nominations
 Nachmittagsprogramm (2004):
2004: Regensburg Short Film Week: Best German Short Film Award
 The Suffering of Mr. Karpf – The Birthday (2009):
2009: Berlin International Film Festival:  Prix UIP Berlin (European Short Film)
2009: European Film Awards: nomination for Best Short Film Award
 The Dragonfly and the Rhinoceros / Die Libelle und das Nashorn (2012):
2012: Oldenburg International Film Festival: nomination for German Independence Award: Best German Film 
 The Invention of Love (2013):
2013: Oldenburg International Film Festival: nomination for German Independence Award: Best German Film
2013: Oldenburg International Film Festival: nomination for German Independence Award: Audience Award
2013: Zurich Film Festival: nomination for  the Golden Eye-award in the category Best German Language Feature Film
2016: Nomination for the German TV award Grimme-Preis in the category Fiction/Special

References

External links
 

1980 births
Living people
Film people from Munich
German women film directors